Piraty XXI veka (Pirates of the 21st Century) is the fifth studio album of the Russian band Leningrad.

Track listing
"WWW" – 2:47
"Бляди" - Blyadi (Whores) – 3:32
"Пидарасы" - Pidarasy (Fags) – 2:55
"Комон еврибади" - Komon evribadi (Russian transliteration of "Come On Everybody") – 2:15
"Собака Баскервилей" - Sobaka Baskerviley (Hound of the Baskervilles) – 2:18
"Резиновый мужик" - Rezinovy muzhik (Rubber Dude) – 1:26
"Мне бы в небо" - Mne by v nebo (I'd Like to Go to Heaven) – 3:36
"Люди не летают" - Lyudi ne letayut (People Can't Fly) – 2:24
"У меня есть всё" - U menya est vsyo (I Have Everything) – 4:27 
"Новый год" - Novy god (New Year) – 2:11
"Бананы" - Banany (Bananas) – 3:42
"Без тебя" - Bez tebya (Without You) – 3:25
"Привет, Джимми Хендрикс!" - Privet, Dzhimi Khendriks! (Hello, Jimi Hendrix!) – 3:34
"Ласточка" - Lastochka (Swallow) – 3:14

External links
Album available for download from the official Leningrad website

2002 albums
Leningrad (band) albums